Mount Caywood is a conspicuous mountain rising midway between Mount Chandler and Mount Huffman, in the interior ice-filled valley of the Behrendt Mountains, Palmer Land. It was mapped by the United States Geological Survey from surveys and from U.S. Navy air photos, 1961–67, and named by the Advisory Committee on Antarctic Names for Lindsay P. Caywood, Jr., geomagnetist at Camp Sky-Hi in this vicinity, summer 1961–62.

References
 

Mountains of Palmer Land